The dwarf splayfoot salamander (Chiropterotriton dimidiatus), also known as the dwarf flat-footed salamander, is a species of salamander in the family Plethodontidae. It is endemic to southern Hidalgo, Mexico.

Its natural habitats are pine-oak and fir forests. It is threatened by habitat loss.

References

Chiropterotriton
Endemic amphibians of Mexico
Taxonomy articles created by Polbot
Amphibians described in 1940